Kentucky Reserve is a small recreational park in Georges Hall overlooking the Georges River.

Parks in New South Wales